Jeff Coetzee (born 25 April 1977) is a South African professional tennis player and competes regularly on the ATP tour, as a doubles specialist.

The 5'8" player plays right-handed, double-handed on both sides and has won six ATP Tour doubles titles in his career. Coetzee plays doubles for the South Africa Davis Cup team.  When Jeff is not traveling, he resides in Florida Hills, South Africa.

ATP Tour finals

Doubles (6–9)

Doubles runners-up (10)
2006: Newport (with Justin Gimelstob, lost to Robert Kendrick and Jürgen Melzer)

Doubles performance timeline

External links
 
 
 

1977 births
Living people
Coloured South African people
South African people of Dutch descent
South African male tennis players
Tennis players at the 2008 Summer Olympics
Olympic tennis players of South Africa